Abdoulaye Camara (born 2 January 1980) is a Malian former professional footballer who played as a defender. He made 9 appearances for the Mali national team from 2002 to 2008.

Club career
After initially playing with Onze Créateurs de Niaréla in Mali, he joined Slovenian club FC Koper in 1997. After one season he moved to Italy to play with Udinese Calcio in the Serie A. After two seasons he moved to Belgium signing with Cercle Brugge, but after at the end of the season he returned to Italy to play with Castel di Sangro Calcio. In 2002, La Louvière brought him for one season, and in summer 2003 he signed with Ligue 2 club Grenoble. By 2007 he was in South Africa playing with top league Thanda Royal Zulu. In 2008, he moved to FC AK before joining Butcherfille Rovers Durban in 2009.

International career
Since 1998 he has been called to represent the Mali national team having 9 caps since his debut in 2002. He had represented Mali at youth levels first at 1995 FIFA U-17 World Championship, and next in 1997 FIFA U-17 World Championship held in Egypt, where they reached the quarter-finals. He also participated in the FIFA Under-20 World Cup held in Nigeria, where they reach the third place.

External links
 
 
 Stats from Slovenia at Prvaliga.

Living people
1980 births
Sportspeople from Bamako
Malian footballers
Mali international footballers
Malian expatriate footballers
Association football defenders
FC Koper players
Expatriate footballers in Slovenia
A.S.D. Castel di Sangro Calcio players
Udinese Calcio players
Serie A players
Expatriate footballers in Italy
Cercle Brugge K.S.V. players
Belgian Pro League players
R.A.A. Louviéroise players
Expatriate footballers in Belgium
Grenoble Foot 38 players
Ligue 2 players
Expatriate footballers in France
Thanda Royal Zulu F.C. players
Expatriate soccer players in South Africa
2002 African Cup of Nations players
Mali under-20 international footballers
F.C. AK players
AS Onze Créateurs de Niaréla players
FC Échirolles players
Mali youth international footballers
21st-century Malian people
Malian expatriate sportspeople in Belgium
Malian expatriate sportspeople in France
Malian expatriate sportspeople in Italy
Malian expatriate sportspeople in South Africa